A crackme (often abbreviated by cm) is a small program designed to test a programmer's reverse engineering skills.

They are programmed by other reversers as a legal way to crack software, since no intellectual property is being infringed upon.

Crackmes, reversemes and keygenmes generally have similar protection schemes and algorithms to those found in proprietary software. However, due to the wide use of packers/protectors in commercial software, many crackmes are actually more difficult as the algorithm is harder to find and track than in commercial software.

Keygenme

A keygenme is specifically designed for the reverser to not only find the protection algorithm used in the application, but also write a small keygen for it in the programming language of their choice.

Most keygenmes, when properly manipulated, can be self-keygenning. For example, when checking, they might generate the corresponding key and simply compare the expected and entered keys. This makes it easy to copy the key generation algorithm.

Often anti-debugging and anti-disassemble routines are used to confuse debuggers or make the disassembly useless. Code-obfuscation  is also used to make the reversing even harder.

References

External links 
 tdhack.com - Includes cryptographic riddles, hackmes and software applications to crack for both Windows and Linux. Polish and English languages are supported.
 Ollydbg - A program used both by beginners and experienced people.

Computer security
Software cracking
Reverse engineering